Andrew Wynford Davies (born 20 September 1936) is a Welsh screenwriter and novelist, best known for his adaptations of To Serve Them All My Days, House of Cards, Middlemarch, Pride and Prejudice, Bleak House, War & Peace, and his original serial A Very Peculiar Practice. He was made a BAFTA Fellow in 2002.

Education and early career

Davies was born in Rhiwbina, Cardiff, Wales. He attended Whitchurch Grammar School in Cardiff and then University College, London, where he received a BA in English in 1957.  He took a teaching position at St. Clement Danes Grammar School in London, where he was on the teaching staff from 1958–61.  He held a similar post at Woodberry Down Comprehensive School in Hackney, London from 1961–63.  Following that, he was a lecturer in English at Coventry College of Education (which later merged with the University of Warwick to become the Faculty of Educational Studies and later the Warwick Institute of Education), and then at the University of Warwick.

In 1960, Davies contributed material to the BBC Home Service's Monday Night at Home strand, alongside Harold Pinter and Ivor Cutler. He wrote his first play for radio in 1964 and many more were to follow.  In 1960, he married Diana Huntley; the couple have a son and daughter. He is resident in Kenilworth, Warwickshire.

Writer

Davies' first television play, Who's Going to Take Me On?, was broadcast in 1967 as part of BBC1's The Wednesday Play strand. His early plays were written as a sideline to his work in education, many of them appearing in anthology series such as Thirty Minute Theatre, Play for Today and Centre Stage. One of his London stage plays, Rose, played on Broadway in 1981, with Glenda Jackson and Jessica Tandy. His first serial adaptation of a work of fiction was To Serve Them All My Days (1980), from the novel by R. F. Delderfield. He wrote A Very Peculiar Practice (1986–88), a campus based comedy-drama series that drew upon his career in education.

He is now best known for his adaptations of classic works of literature for television including 
the Charles Dickens short story The Signalman (1976), Pride and Prejudice (1995) starring Colin Firth and Jennifer Ehle, Vanity Fair (1998), Bleak House (2005) and Sense and Sensibility (2008). He is the writer of the screenplays for the BBC production Middlemarch (1994) and a planned film of the same name once announced for 2011 release.

Davies also co-devised with Bernadette Davis the sitcom Game On for BBC2 and co-wrote the first two series broadcast in 1995 and 1996. The popularity of his adaptation of Michael Dobbs's political thriller House of Cards was a significant influence in Dobbs's decision to write two sequels, which Davies also adapted for television. In film, he has collaborated on the screenplays for the first two Bridget Jones films, based on Helen Fielding novels.

He is a prolific writer for children. The first of his novels was Conrad's War, published by Blackie in 1978. Davies won the annual Guardian Children's Fiction Prize, which is judged by a panel of British children's writers and recognises the best book by an author who has not yet won it. He has written Alfonso Bonzo (book and television series) and the adventures of Marmalade Atkins (television series and numerous books). He also wrote the stories Dark Towers and Badger Girl for BBC TV's Look and Read programmes for schools audiences.

2008 saw the release of his adaptations of the 1999 novel Affinity by Sarah Waters, Evelyn Waugh's Brideshead Revisited (a film), Charles Dickens' Little Dorrit (a BBC series). Little Dorrit won seven of eleven Emmy nominations and earned Davies an Emmy for Outstanding Writing for a Miniseries.

Adaptations of Dombey and Son, one of Dickens' lesser-read works and Anthony Trollope's Palliser novels were scrapped by the BBC in late 2009, following a move away from "bonnet dramas".

ITV was looking to recreate its period drama success with Downton Abbey with a new series Mr Selfridge, written by Davies and starring Jeremy Piven. An initial ten-part series first aired on 6 January 2013 and it has run for 4 series by 2016.

Davies' six-part adaptation of Leo Tolstoy's War & Peace was broadcast on BBC One in January and February 2016. Following its success, the BBC announced in July 2016 that it would be followed up with a six-part adaptation of Victor Hugo's Les Misérables to be scripted by Davies.  In May 2017, it was announced that BBC will adapt Vikram Seth's magnum opus A Suitable Boy into an eight-part series to be scripted by Davies.

In May 2018, he announced at the Hay Festival that he is adapting John Updike's Rabbit, Run for television.

Filmography

Television series and serials
Eleanor Marx (1977)
The Legend of King Arthur (1979)
To Serve Them All My Days (1980-81)
Dark Towers (Look and Read, 1981)
Educating Marmalade (1982)
Diana (1984)
Badger Girl (Look and Read, 1984)
Danger: Marmalade at Work (1984)
A Very Peculiar Practice (1986–88)
Mother Love (1989)
House of Cards (1990)
The Old Devils (1992)
Anglo-Saxon Attitudes (1992)
The Boot Street Band (1993-94)
To Play the King (1993)
Middlemarch (1994)
Game On (with Bernadette Davis, 1995-98)
Pride and Prejudice (1995)
The Final Cut (1995)
Wilderness (with Bernadette Davis, 1996)
The Fortunes and Misfortunes of Moll Flanders (1996)
Bill's New Frock (Book Box, 1998)
Vanity Fair (1998)
Wives and Daughters (1999)
Take a Girl Like You (2000)
The Way We Live Now (2001)
Daniel Deronda (2002)
Doctor Zhivago (2002)
Tipping the Velvet (2002)
He Knew He Was Right (2004)
Bleak House (2005)
The Line of Beauty (2006)
The Diary of a Nobody (2007)
Fanny Hill (2007)
Sense and Sensibility (2008)
Little Dorrit (2008)
South Riding (2011)
Mr Selfridge (2013–16)
Quirke (2014)
War & Peace (2016)
Les Misérables (2019)
Sanditon (2019)
A Suitable Boy (2020 BBC One TV series)

Television plays
Who's Going to Take Me On? (The Wednesday Play, 1965)
Is That Your Body, Boy? (Thirty-Minute Theatre, 1970)
No Good Unless It Hurts (Sporting Scenes, 1973)
The Water Maiden (Bedtime Stories, 1974)
Grace (Centre Play, 1975)
The Imp of the Perverse (Centre Play, 1975)
A Martyr to the System (BBC2 Playhouse, 1976)
The Signalman (A Ghost Story for Christmas, 1976)
Velvet Glove (1977)
Fearless Frank (BBC2 Play of the Week, 1978)
Renoir My Father (BBC2 Play of the Week, 1978)
After the Gold Rush (Scene, 1980)
Bavarian Night (Play for Today, 1981)
Heartattack Hotel (1983)
Baby I Love You (Scene, 1985)
Pythons on the Mountain (Summer Season, 1985)
Time After Time (Screen Two, 1986)
Inappropriate Behaviour (Screen Two, 1987)
Lucky Sunil (Screen Two, 1988)
A Private Life (Screen Two, 1989)
Ball Trap on the Cote Sauvage (Screen One, 1989)
Filipina Dreamgirls (Screen One, 1991)
A Very Polish Practice (Screen One, 1992)
Anna Lee (1993)
Harnessing Peacocks (1993)
A Few Short Journeys of the Heart (Stages, 1994)
Emma (1996)
Getting Hurt (Obsessions, 1998)
A Rather English Marriage (1998)
Othello (2001)
Boudica (2003)
Falling (2005)
The Chatterley Affair (2006)
Northanger Abbey (The Jane Austen Season, 2007)
A Room with a View (2007)
Affinity (2008)
Sleep with Me (2009)
A Poet in New York (2014)

Cinema
Consuming Passions (1988)
Circle of Friends (1995)
The Tailor of Panama (2001)
Bridget Jones's Diary (2001, with Helen Fielding and Richard Curtis)
Bridget Jones: The Edge of Reason (2004, with Helen Fielding)
Brideshead Revisited (2008)
The Three Musketeers (2011)

Novels
 Conrad's War (Blackie and Son, 1978) —winner of the Guardian Prize
 The Legend of King Arthur (Armada, 1979) —novelization of Davies' eight-part BBC serial of the same name
 A Very Peculiar Practice (Coronet, 1986) —novelization of the first series of A Very Peculiar Practice
 A Very Peculiar Practice: The New Frontier (Methuen, 1988) —novelization of the second series
 Getting Hurt (1989), for adults
 Dirty Faxes (1990), short stories
 B. Monkey (1992) —adapted by others as the 1998 film B. Monkey

Stage plays
Diary of a Desperate Woman (1979)
Rose (1980)
Prin (1990)

Picture books
Andrew and Diana Davies have written at least two children's picture books.
 Poonam's Pets (Methuen Children's, 1990), illustrated by Paul Dowling
 Raj In Charge (Hamish Hamilton, 1994), illus. Debi Gliori

References

Further references
 Cardwell, Sarah (2005) 'Andrew Davies'. Manchester: MUP.

External links

1936 births
Living people
Welsh television writers
Welsh screenwriters
Guardian Children's Fiction Prize winners
Fellows of the Royal Society of Literature
Academics of the University of Warwick
Writers from Cardiff
Alumni of University College London
BAFTA winners (people)
BAFTA fellows
Emmy Award winners
People educated at Whitchurch Grammar School, Cardiff
Primetime Emmy Award winners
People from Rhiwbina